The TSB Festival of Lights is an annual event held in Pukekura Park, New Plymouth.  Running for free every year from mid-December to late January, it has a daytime and night time programme of events for people of all ages, with light installations illuminating the park. In 2021 the festival won the Best Local Government and NZ's Favourite Event Awards at the 2021 NZ Events Association Awards. 

It was the 1970s when music and entertainment became a feature of the annual lights event. It was 1993 when the festival was officially named the 'Festival of Lights' The festival is a summer attraction and cultural event for the city. , and is attended by over 125,000 people each year.

Sponsorship
The festival is sponsored by TSB Bank.

References

External links
 

Tourist attractions in Taranaki
New Plymouth
Flower festivals in New Zealand
Summer events in New Zealand
Light festivals